David Sacks is an American television writer and producer.

Biography
He attended Harvard College, graduating with a degree in Government. While there he began his comedy writing career as an editor of the school's humor magazine, The Harvard Lampoon. Upon graduating, Sacks moved to Los Angeles and began writing for television. His writing and producing credits include seasons five and six on The Simpsons, for which he won an Emmy Award, 3rd Rock from the Sun, for which he received a Golden Globe Award, Malcolm in the Middle, The Tick, Pound Puppies, Regular Show on Cartoon Network, Murphy Brown, and created and executive produced Lewis Black's The Root of All Evil for Comedy Central. In 2013, Sacks produced a weekly podcast Spiritual Tools for An Outrageous World available on iTunes and Stitcher.com.

References list

External links 
 TorahonItunes.com

American television writers
American male television writers
American television producers
Year of birth missing (living people)
Living people
The Harvard Lampoon alumni
Harvard College alumni
Jewish American writers
21st-century American Jews